Julian Reginald Day is a published author, IT computer, project manager and charity fundraiser.

Career

Day studied Business Studies at Plymouth Polytechnic (UK) and in 1978, Day entered the computer industry as a trainee sales and support executive with Burroughs in England. Since migrating to Australia in 1986, Day has been an IT consultant to large private and public organisations. Day has presented papers at conferences in the UK, United States, New Zealand, Australia, and throughout Asia. He was the Editor of the Australian magazine SoftWare in 1995–1996 and has written many published articles for a variety of IT and business publications.

Day is the current Managing Director of Consensus Group and is a member of the Australian Computer Society.

After surviving cancer three times as a child, Day founded Waterline Challenge. He conceived the idea while he walked consecutive sections of the New South Wales Coast over the last 12 years, raising funds for various charities.

Published works
 Walking on a BOB or TWO (2014)
 Judge of Global Enterprise Challenge (2012)
 One One Five (2011), co-authored with Alan Manly and Graeme Brosnan.
 Success of Agile Environment in Complex Projects (2010), co-authored with Dr. Abbass Ghanbary
 Software Innovation in Australia (Webinar 2010)
 Requirements Modelling of Business Web Applications: Challenges and Solutions (2009) Proceedings of ISSEC 2009 International Conference. . Co-authored with Dr. Abbass Ghanbary
 Australian Software Excellence: Consensus Software Award Selection 2004 and 2005 (2005) Published in conjunction with Bhuvan Unhelkar, PhD, MethodScience, 
 Australian Software Engineering Guide (1997)
 Report Writers Product Guide (1996)
 Financial Software Product Review (1996)
 Australian Software Development Directory (1996) co-authored with Dash Forghani
 Benchmarking & Performance Indicators (1995)
 Client Server Technology Review (1995)
 Worlds Largest Computer Based Training (CBT) Project (1995)
 Business Process Re-engineering "From Paradigm to Practice" (1995)
 Help Desk Software Product Review (1995)
 Software Security Product Review (1995)
 Australian Software Development Directory (1995) co-authored with Dash Forghani
 Australian CASE Directory'' (1993) co-authored with Dr. Yogesh Deshpande and Dash Forghani

References 

Year of birth missing (living people)
Living people
English computer scientists
Charity fundraisers (people)
Burroughs Corporation people
Alumni of the University of Plymouth
British writers
Australian writers